Zacharovana Dolina (translated as "Enchanted Valley") is a state park located in Irshava Raion, Ukraine.

Wildlife sanctuary 
Located in Irshava rayon, Transcarpathia, covering an area of  within Protected Area (National Natural Reserve) Zacharovanyj Kraj. Zacharovana Dolyna was designed in 1978 to protect picturesque stony crests in the Smerekovyj potik upstream. On the right bank of the river is a cave.

Vegetation
The vegetation of the park is formed mainly by beech forests mixed with fir trees (Picea Excelsa).

The adjacent villages are Pidgirn and Ilnytsja.

Due to development of a new Protected Area called Zacharovanyk Kraj National Park covering Zacharovan Dolyna, the latter protective area remains protected (Zakaznik) as part of the National Park. As soon as the management plan (Parl Design documents) are ready and approved, status of Zakaznik can be canceled.

References 

Geography of Zakarpattia Oblast
Parks in Ukraine